Ivar Werner Oftedal (25 February 1894 – 30 May 1976) was a Norwegian mineralogist.

He was born in Larvik. He took his cand.real. degree in 1929 and the dr.philos. degree in 1941, both at the University of Oslo. After 29 years as a conservator at the University Museum, he was a professor of geology at the University of Oslo from 1949 to 1964, specializing in mineralogy, geochemistry and crystallography.

References

1894 births
1976 deaths
People from Larvik
Norwegian mineralogists
Norwegian geochemists
crystallographers
University of Oslo alumni
Academic staff of the University of Oslo